A list of Dhallywood films released in 1967.

Released films

See also

 1967 in Pakistan

References

External links 
 Bangladeshi films on Internet Movie Database

Bangladesh
Lists of Pakistani Bengali films by year